Antar Laniyan  is a Nigerian veteran actor, film producer, and director.

Early life
Laniyan was born in Osogbo, the capital of Osun State southwestern Nigeria. He attended Baptist secondary school were he obtained is (WAEC) certificate in Lagos State before he later proceeded to the University of Ibadan where he obtained a Bachelor of Arts degree in theatre arts.

Career
Laniyan began acting in 1981 and the first major role he played as a professional actor was the role of a "major general" in a film titled Everybody wants to know during his days at the Kakaki Art Squad.
He has featured in several Nigerian films including Sango, a film scripted by Wale Ogunyemi and produced by Obafemi Lasode.
He was the director of the first episode of Super Story, the award-winning Nigerian soap opera produced by Wale Adenuga in the year 2000. He also directed Oh Father Oh Daughter and This Life produced from the stable of Wale Adenuga Production.

Selected filmography
 Sango (1997)
 Super story (episode 1)
 Kakanfo (2020)
 Lucifer (2019)

See also
 List of Yoruba people

References

Living people
Year of birth missing (living people)
20th-century Nigerian male actors
21st-century Nigerian male actors
Male actors from Osun State
Male actors in Yoruba cinema
Nigerian male film actors
People from Osun
University of Ibadan alumni
Yoruba male actors
Nigerian male television actors
Nigerian film producers
Nigerian film directors